Jordan-Elbridge High School is a high school located in Jordan, New York.  It is part of the Jordan-Elbridge Central School District.

External links

Public high schools in New York (state)
Schools in Onondaga County, New York